Frederick Griffing's ship is the remains of a sailing vessel buried beneath the current Levi's Plaza in San Francisco where Frederick Griffing's wharf previously existed.   When the plaza was constructed in 1978, the archaeological site was discovered.  It is believed that the ship is either the Palmyra or the William Grey.

References

Buildings and structures completed in 1852
History of San Francisco
Shipwrecks on the National Register of Historic Places in California
National Register of Historic Places in San Francisco